"Baby Love" is a song by American singer Regina. The single hit number one on the dance charts for two weeks in mid-1986. The single crossed over to the pop singles chart, where it peaked at number 10 on US Billboard Hot 100 and at number 30 on the Billboard Soul Singles chart. "Baby Love" would be her only single to chart on both the Pop and Soul Singles charts, but several follow up singles charted on the dance chart.

The song was written by Stephen Bray, Regina Richards & Mary Kessler.  Bray had written several hits for Madonna, and "Baby Love" was actually intended for her to record. After she declined, Regina recorded the vocal herself in late 1985, though with Bray's production it sounded similar to Madonna's other recordings of the time and was sometimes mistaken for one.

Although recorded the same year, the first released version of the song was by Dutch girl group The Star Sisters, who released it on their 1985 album Danger.

A music video for "Baby Love" featuring Regina was created on February 12, 1986 by West 78th Street Records in collaboration with Hugmynd and Saga Film to promote the single.

Charts

Weekly charts

Year-end charts

Dannii Minogue version

"Baby Love" was covered by Australian singer Dannii Minogue for her debut album, Love and Kisses (1991). Minogue recorded her version for the European release of her album and its original pop mix can be found on its single release. The song was produced by Les Adams, Emma Freilich and Andy Whitmore. The remix by Steve 'Silk' Hurley was released in October 1991 as the fourth single. It reached the top 20 in Ireland and the United Kingdom, becoming Minogue's fourth top 20 single. In Australia, the song charted within the top 30. The remixes of the song done by Steve 'Silk' Hurly were successful in dance clubs and are credited with giving Minogue a new sound and image.

Critical reception
Matthew Hocter from Albumism noted that "with a clearer focus on that New Jack Swing sound" and the addition of some "heavy on house music" covers "Jump to the Beat" and "Baby Love", "the younger Minogue demonstrated that she had a very soulful approach to music." John Lucas from AllMusic called the song "a genuinely credible early-'90s house music number". Mark Frith from Smash Hits commented, "...this is Dannii's foray into the world of soul music. She obviously fancies herself as some sort of soul diva and she manages to pass herself off as one quite efficiently. As a result, Baby Love works quite well."

Formats and track listings
 CD single (Europe and Australia) (D11077)
 "Baby Love" (Silky 70's edit)
 "Baby Love" (Silky 70's 12-inch mix)
 "Baby Love" (Maurice's House remix)

 Cassette single (C11077)
 "Baby Love" (Silky 70's edit)
 "Baby Love" (Maurice's House remix)

 Vinyl single (X14345)
 "Baby Love" (Silky 70's edit)
 "Baby Love" (Maurice's House remix)
 "Baby Love" (Maurice's House Mo Dub 4 Ya mix)

Personnel
 Dannii Minogue – lead vocals
 Les Adams, Emma Freilich, Andy Whitmore – production
 Steve 'Silk' Hurley – remix, additional production
 Simon Fowler – photography

Charts

References

1986 singles
1986 songs
1991 singles
Atlantic Records singles
Dannii Minogue songs
MCA Records singles
Songs written by Stephen Bray
Warner Music Group singles